The 2004 United States House of Representatives elections in West Virginia were held on November 2, 2004 to determine who will represent the state of West Virginia in the United States House of Representatives. West Virginia has three seats in the House, apportioned according to the 2000 United States Census. Representatives are elected for two-year terms.

Overview

District 1 

 

Incumbent Democrat Alan Mollohan defeated Republican Alan Lee Parks. This district covers the northern part of the state.

District 2 

 

Incumbent Republican Shelley Moore Capito defeated Democrat Erik Wells, a State Senator. This district covers the central part of the state.

District 3 

 

Incumbent Democrat Nick Rahall defeated Republican Delegate Rick Snuffer. This district covers the southern part of the state.

References 

2004 West Virginia elections
West Virginia
2004